Kapilendra Deva (Odia: କପିଳେନ୍ଦ୍ର ଦେବ; r. 1434–1467 CE) was the founder of the Suryavamsa Gajapati Empire that ruled parts of eastern and southern India, including present-day Odisha as the center of the empire. He came to the throne after staging a military coup against the preceding and the last ruler from the Eastern Ganga dynasty, Bhanu Deva IV. His name is also written as Kapilendra Routray or Sri Sri Kapilendra Deva. Kapilendra claimed descent from the Surya Vamsha (Sun dynasty) of the Mahābhārata and took the title of shri shri ...(108 times) Gajapati Gaudeshwara NabaKoti Karnata  Kalabargeswara or the lord of Bengal (Gauda), of the Karnataka region or Vijayanagara, the lord of Gulbarga and of nine crore subjects.

Early life
There are multiple popular theories about the origin of Kapilendra Deva's family and his initial life. Records from the Madala Panji of the Jagannath Temple in Puri state that he was known as Kapila Rauta and belonged to the Surya Vamsa line and was born into a family whose job was to tend the cattle of a Brahmin. Due to a divine symbol of cobra (naga) seated by his head covering him from the sunlight while he was resting, the Brahmin predicted that Kapila would become a king one day. Later Kapila went to Puri where he used to beg near the Vimala Temple of the Puri Jagannath temple complex and was later adopted by the last Eastern Ganga dynasty ruler Bhanudeva following a divine dream. He was later appointed in his younger days as a military general of the Ganga forces and was assigned the task to fight the Muslim forces of Bengal. Another version of the Madala Panji maintains the same account with regards to the origin of Kapilendra Deva but changes his name to Kapila Raut who was at the service of the Ganga king Bhanudeva IV and stayed inside the palace. When the kingdom of Bhanudeva was threatened by an invasion, Kapila Raut gave a good account of himself as a brave soldier and after the death of Bhanudeva, Kapila became the ruler of Odisha assuming the name Kapilendra Deva.

Inscriptions
Raghudevapuram copper plate grant of Raghudeva Narendra who was the governor of Rajahmundry Rajya and also a nephew of Kapilendra Deva gives valuable details about the family's history. The family can be traced back to Kapilendra Deva's grandfather Kapileswara who was holding the position of a Nayaka. Kapileswara Nayaka was thus in the military service of the Gangas and occupied the position of a lieutenant in the army. He had a son named Jageswara who was also in the service and possessed a great number of elephants. Jageswara was married to Belama and they had three sons named Balarama, Kapilendra and Parashurama Harichandana. Raghudeva Narendra was the son of Parashurama.

Consolidation of Authority by Suppressing Internal Rebellions

Due to the weakening administration of the Eastern Ganga dynasty rulers, Kapilendra Deva mounted the throne with internal support while the last ruler of the dynasty, Bhanu Deva IV was on a military expedition in the southern territories. He was declared as the new king with a rajyabhishek ceremony at Bhubaneswar. Since the accession was based on a coup or rebellion, some feudal kings of Odisha like Matsarvamshi of Oddadi, Shilavamshis of Nandapur, Bishnukundina of Panchadhara, etc. declined his authority and declared themselves independent. Around the same time, the Sultanate of Jaunpur also posed as an external threat to his kingdom. He appointed his able minister Gopinath Mahapatra to deal with the Jaunpur threat which was successfully executed by him and Kapilendra Deva himself suppressed the internal rebels with force. The rebels were suppressed by the year 1440 CE. The rebellious troubles dealt by him with force are proven by his Lingaraj Temple declaration in which he has ordered the rebels to accept his rule or be toppled from power.

Coronation as Gajapati 
The chronicle Madala Panji detailed the event of Kapilendra Deva's coronation as Gajapati of the realm succeeding Bhanu Deva IV, the last ruler of the Eastern Gangas. It mentioned that the coronation took place at Bhubaneswar on 2 kākara śukḷa 4 aṅka 2. The date with respect to the Odia calendar corresponds to the Gregorian calendar on 29 June 1435. Thus with the coronation of Kapilendra Deva as the Gajapati of the Odradesa realm, he started his era known as Kapilabda and laid the foundation of the Suryavamsa dynasty.

The Odia Military under Kapilendra Deva 

Different historical sources give varied accounts about the Odishan military commanded by the Gajapatis. According to Muslim text Buhan-m-Mansir, Kapilendra had an elephant force numbering two hundred thousand (2,00,000). This number of war elephants is usually a very huge number compared even to any military of the existing kingdoms during the times of Kapilendra Deva himself in India.  Nizzamuddin writes that the Gajapati encamped on the Godavari river banks with an infantry of seven hundred thousand (700,000). Another Muslim source documents that Kapilendra Deva raided Bidar with only 10,000 foot soldiers while being assisted by the Vellamati chiefs of Telangana.
The Odia poet Sarala Das who lived during the era of Kapilendra Deva, has given descriptions about the military divisions in his Odia Mahabharata. The divisions mentioned are:-

 Hantakaru Dala :- This division was in the forefront of the marching army and was responsible forward scouting, clearing jungles and marking roads for the army.
 Aguani Thata :- The division that marched ahead of the main army.
 Pradhana Vala :- The main division of the army
 Pachhiani Thata :- The rear guard division
 Angavala :- The specially deployed bodyguards of the military generals and the royalties.
 Paridhana :-The contingent of the army that stayed in charge of conquered forts and the adjoining regions.

Sarala Das also gives a picture of different musical instruments used to motivate soldiers during the march and warfare Some names of the weapons used by the Gajapati army are also mentioned  like Dhanu, Troua, Sara, Asi, Parigha, Pattisa, Kunta, Jathi, Buruja, Saveli, etc. Information with regard to breaking of the gateways and the walls of the fort with the help of horses, elephants and iron instruments is also found in the same text.

Military Conquests and Territorial Expansion 

The military hegemony of Odisha had declined during the last line of Eastern Ganga dynasty rulers which provided enough opportunity for the rising powers in its neighborhood. When Kapilendra Deva took over the throne, hostile Muslim powers like the Sultan of Jaunpur (Mahmud Shah), Bahmani Sultanate and the young ruler of Bengal Samsuddin Ahmad Shah were continuously preparing to invade Odisha. Rival Hindu powers such as Deva Raya II of Vijayanagara along with Reddys of Rajmahendri had conquered advancing as far as the Simhanchalam territory in the south. Along with suppressing internal rebellions, Kapilendra Deva first defeated the Jaunpur forces and then contained the Bengal forces with the help of his minister Gopinath Mahapatra after which only he initiated his aggressive military campaigns of the Southern and Deccan parts of India.

Conquest of Gauda region in Bengal 
The Gopinathpur inscription of 1447 CE describes his campaign against the ruler of Bengal who tried to raid Odisha but was beaten back by the Gajapati army led by Gopinath Mahapatra, the minister of Kapilendra Deva. The Odishan army conquered territories of Bengal to the west of Ganga river including the fort of Gar Mandaran. Historian R. Subramaniam describes that the title 'Brhamarbara' retained by Kapilendra Deva from the days of his service at the Ganga king's court clearly signifies his control over Brhamarkuta region of Bengal. An inscription in the Jagannath temple of Puri that is dated to the year 1450 CE narrates the conquest of Gauda by Kapilendra Deva after defeating Malika Parisa (Malik Padsah) which in short refers to the contemporary sultan of Bengal by the name Nasiruddin Mahmud Shah. The region east of the river Ganga and until modern Burdhawan district was known as the Jaleswar division which was handed over to the later ruler of Bengal Ali Vardi Khan by the Marathas during their time. Kapilendra Deva's aide Jalesara Narendra Mahapatra was appointed as the governor of this region. After this victory, Kapilendra Deva accepts the title epithet of 'Gaudeswara 'which meant the he is the lord of Gauda kingdom. Katakarajavanshavalli records state about the holy dip of the Gajapati himself in the river Ganga and the donation of Tulasipur shasan villages to Brahmins there. This clearly indicates that Kapilendra Deva was in control of regions beyond the river Ganga to its East.

Conquest of Rajamahendri 
 First Campaign in 1444 CE - The first campaign against the Hindu alliance of Vijayanagar kingdom and Rajamahendri Reddys was unsuccessful as Odia forces had to face a two front war with both the Jaunpur Muslim forces in the north and the rival Vijayanagar Hindu forces under the able leadership of the Devaraya II's able commander Mallapa. Kapilendra Deva first diverted his attention in dealing with the invasion in the northern frontiers and hence the campaign in the south was abandoned.
Second Campaign in 1446 CE and Capture of Kondavidu by Hamvira Deva - The Odia forces returned in the year 1446 CE led by Hamvira Deva or Hamvira Kumara Mahapatra, the eldest son of Kapilendra Deva. The political alliance between Vijayanagar and the Reddy kingdom had ceased to exist as Deva Raya II had died and the power passed on to a weaker successor, Malikarjuna Raya. The Reddy kingdom was conquered and the Odia forces occupied Kondavidu by the year 1454 CE. A vassal king by the name Ganadeva was made the feudal ruler of the region. Hamvira Deva was declared as the governor of the southern territories by Kapilendra Deva after this conquest.

Malwa expeditions 
Conquest of Mahur - The Veligalani plates and Chiruvrolu inscriptions records the prowess of the Gajapati during the Malwa expeditions. Although there is not much mention of a war, but it does show geopolitical scenario in the region during the march of Gajapati Kapilendra Deva's forces as is described by the fear of the Gajapati army among the rulers of Vijayanagara, Gulbarga and Malwa. The text Gaṅgādāsapratāpavilāsam and the cāṭu verses mentions the conquest of the Mahur fort in 1457 CE during the Malwa expeditions. It describes the campaign where Kapilendra Deva's forces marched against the dominions of Malwa sultan Mahmud Khalji and the Bahmani sultan and wrested control of the forts of Mahur and Bedadakota(Bidar).

Conquest of Telegana (Gulberga or Kalaberga) 
The political situation of Telegana provided an opportunity for the Gajapati army to intervene and capture the territory. The Velama chiefs of Devara Konda in Telegana and the Bahmani sultan Aladdin Ahmad Shah II had cordial relations in the initial stages but on the event of war between Vijayanagar and Bahmani Sultanate, the Velama chiefs backed Bahmani sultanate and sought to fight Vijaynagar. In an act of revenge the Bahmani sultan invaded the Telegana region and the Bahmani commander Sanjar Khan extracted vengeance on the common people. Hindus were sold as slaves. In 1456 CE Humayun Shah ascended the throne of the Bahmani sultanate and his general Sikander Khan suppressed the rebel Velama chiefs after occupying Devarakonda. Kapilendra Deva was invited by the Velama chiefs to rescue them from Bahmani rulers. In 1458 CE, a battle ensued at Devara Konda between Odia forces led by Hamvira Deva and Bahmani forces. As a result of this battle Odia forces came out as victorious and Telegana region became a feudal state of the Gajapati empire with the Velama chiefs as the vassal rulers. The victory over the Bahamani forces at Devarakonda in 1458 CE enabled Kapilendra Deva to assume the title of Kalavargeśvara which meant the Lord of Kalabarga(Gulbarga).

Campaigns against Bahmani Sultanate and March on Bidar 
 First Campaign - After the death of Humayun Shah in 1462 CE, his underage son Nizam Shah was crowned as the ruler of the Bahmani sultanate. With the help of Zamindars of Telegana and the Velama chiefs the Odia forces marched towards Bidar, the then capital of the Bahmanis. Widespread loot and rampage of Bahmani country side ensued during this march. However, due to the invasion by Muslim Sharqui ruler of Jaunpur on the northern borders of Odisha with 3,00,000 cavalry and 1400 war elephants forced Kapilendra Deva to abandon the campaign and move against the invading enemy.
Second Campaign - During his second expedition on Bidar, the Bahmani sultanate faced another simultaneous invasion from the Malwa kingdom due to which the Odia forces easily captured the capital Bidar and carried out widespread loot and destruction of the kingdom. Later Malwa and its capital Dhara was also invaded successfully by the Odia forces.

Subjugation of Vijayanagar Kingdom and Expansion till Tiruchirappalli 

From the documents of Gangadasa Bilasa Charitam it is known that Kapilendra Deva ordered Hamvira Deva to conquer Vijayanagar and Bahmani sultanate. Hamvira Deva successfully captured the Vijaynagar capital, Hampi and forced the weak ruler Malikarjuna Raya to pay yearly taxes. Hamvira Deva's commander Tamavupala conquered the southern states of Udayagiri (Nellore district) and Chandragiri in the year 1460 CE. The inscriptions of Srirangam temple near Trichinapalli dictate that Hamvira Deva captured as far as Trichinapalli, Tanjore and Arcot in south before stopping his advance. Hamvira Deva's son Dakshina Kapileswara Kumara became the governor of the southernmost territories of Chandragiri in the year 1464 CE after its conquest.

By 1464 CE, Kapilendra Deva was the undisputed master of the empire from the Ganges in the north to Tiruchirappalli in the south along the coast. Thus he could proudly assume the imperial titles of Gajapati Gauḍeśvara Navakoṭi Karṇāṭa Kalavargeśvara with due justification. According to historian R. C. Majumdar, Kapilendra Deva was the most powerful Hindu king of his time and under him Odisha became an empire stretching from the lower Ganga in the north to the Kaveri in the south. The Gopinathpur inscription aptly describes his position in 1464 CE:

Kṛtvā saṃyati Māḷāvendra-jayinaṃ senādhināthaṃ tu yaṃ Gauḍendrasya nitāntam Utkala-patha-prasthāna rodhārgaḷaṃ Śrīkhaṃṇḍādri payodharopāri karaṃ nirmāya Sānaṃdaṃ Kapileśvaro viharate Karṇāṭa-rājya-śriyā

Consolidation of the Gajapati Empire

The Gajapati Empire which reached its height in 1464 CE under Kapilendra Deva was organised into two administrative divisions of Dandapata and Rajya. Most of core regions of the empire in the north came under his direct control which were divided into Dandapathas(the division continuing from the Eastern Gangas) under a Governor(parikśa) or were controlled by the feudatory samanta rajas. The southern parts of the empire were divided into Rajyas which were ruled by Governors.

Constructive Activities and Cultural Renaissance of the Odia Society 

Kapilendra Deva patronized vaishnavism and expanded the Jagannath temple at Puri.  Although his entire life was spent in warfare, the Jagannath temple became the center for an efflorescence of drama and dance (Odissi) and other forms of art during Gajapati rule.  He was a great patron of Vedic culture and himself wrote a Sanskrit play called Parshuram Bijaya. He constructed the Shaivite temple of Kapileswar in Bhubaneswar which shows that he was tolerant to every sectarian belief under the Hindu domain. It was during the rule of Kapilendra Deva when Odia language was officially used as an administrative language and the poet Sarala Das wrote the Odia Mahabharata. Several learned poets and writers were promoted by him. Sanskrit poets also flourished during this era like Visvanatha Kaviraja who wrote Sahitya Darpana and Chandrakala Natika along with other works, Narsingha Mishra Vajapeyi wrote Samksepasariraka vartika and Kalidasa Chayani wrote Suddhichandrika.

Kapilendra Deva had declared himself as the servant ruler of lord Jagannath which also reflects from his title Routaray meaning the lord's servant king. Narendra tank at the Puri Jagannath temple premises was constructed by Kapilendra Deva in the memory of his martyred younger brother, Veer Narendra Deva. Fourteen out of sixteen ghats of the tank are named after his fourteen nephews. The two concentric defensive stone walls known as Kurma Prachira (the inner wall measuring 400’ x 278’) and Meghanada Prachira (the outer wall measuring 665’ x 644’ with height varying from 20’ to 24’) were constructed during the rule of Kapilendra Deva. The Chandan Jatra festival of Lord Jagannath was initiated during his rule. He himself donated a large amount of jewelry and utensils to the Puri temple during the 41 anka of his rule. The Gajapati pledged to donate equal amount of wealth and rights to the Brahmins. He ordered the banishing of Chaukidari tax paid by the Brahmins previously and also banned the resumption of waste and pasture lands. He had ordered his officials to follow the path of justice, righteousness and Brahminical Hindu spiritual teachings and had issued warning to them to face the punishment of exile if they failed to do so.  During his rule, two Dadhivamana temples were constructed, one each in the village of Kaunrpur and Gopinathpur in Cuttack district. Kapilendra Deva was a builder of a welfare state and had ordered not to commit atrocities or impose excessive hardships on the people of his kingdom.

Last days of Kapilendra Deva 

Kapilendra deva was troubled by treacherous internal subjects who were opposed to his overthrowing of the Eastern Ganga dynasty. His edicts in the Puri Jagannath temple towards his end days provide a glimpse of his troubled state of mind due to rebels and traitors. He had taken oath to punish all those who rebelled against him.  Before his death in 1467 CE, he chose his youngest son Purushottama Deva, as heir, resulting in a rebellion by Hamvira Deva.  In 1472, Purushottam was defeated and Hamvira Deva became king, but in 1476 CE, Purushottam fought back and recaptured the throne.

References

Bibliography 
 
 

15th-century Indian monarchs
History of Odisha
History of India by region
Odisha
People from Odisha
Jagannath
Jagannath Temple Complex